Mette Thiesen (born 20 December 1981 in Fredensborg) is a Danish politician and former schoolteacher who has been a member of the Folketing since June 2019 and represented Danish People's Party since February 2023. She joined the Nye Borgerlige political party in May 2017 and represented it in Parliament until November 2022. She was a city council member in Hillerød Municipality from January 2014 until December 2021 first representing the Conservative People's Party and since Nye Borgerlige

In November she left Nye Borgerlige due to personal issues consequently becoming the fastest politician in Danish history to leave the party one was elected for, having left six days after her re-election in the 2022 general election.

Background 

Mette Thiesen was born in Fredensborg as the daughter of radio mechanic Michael Petersen and teacher Jytte Thiesen. She graduated from Espergærde Gymnasium in 2001 and underwent a teacher education at N. Zahles Seminarium 2004-2008.

In interviews Thiesen has told that there on her grandmother's and father's side a charcoal burners with Spanish descent in her family and that she has studied Italian at a high level at the gymnasium. Furthermore she has described her childhood home as leftist but politics at the same not being a usual point of discussion and explained how she got most of her political values from her grandfather who voted for Mogens Glistrup's Progress Party (Fremskridtspartiet). She has said that her sister is "very leftist" and they therefore have agreed to not talk about politics when being together.

After finishing education she worked at different elementary schools from 2008 until 2019 where she was elected af member of the Folketing. She is the mother of two boys.

Political career

The Conservative People's Party 
At the 2013 local elections Thiesen was elected a member of the city council in Hillerød Municipality for The Conservative People's Party (Det Konservative Folkeparti). At the 2015 general election she was candidate for the party in North Zealand Constituency without achieving election. On 27 June 2017 her shift from the Conservatives to Nye Borgerlige was announced. Explaining the shift she described on several occasions finding herself in opposition to her former party and its mayor Dorte Meldgaard and stated among other things:

Nye Borgerlige 
At the 2017 local elections Thiesen was re-elected to the city council of Hillerød, this time for Nye Borgerlige, thus becoming the party's first ever and at the time only elected politician. At the 2019 general election Thiesen ran as lead candidate in North Zealand and was elected as one of the party's four first ever members of the Danish Parliament alongside Lars Boje Mathiesen, Peter Seier Christensen, and Pernille Vermund. At the 2022 general election she was re-elected as one of the party's now six seats along the three previously mentioned as well as Mikkel Bjørn Sørensen and Kim Edberg Andersen.

Independent (løsgænger) 

On 2 November, TV 2 published a recording from Nye Borgerlige's election party at Christiansborg. The recording displayed a heated argument between two or more persons culminating with one man throwing beer in the face of another. On 7 November, several media reported that the beer-throwing man had been Thiesen's boyfriend, who had violently assaulted an employee in party. The leader of Nye Borgerlige, Pernille Vermund stated that the employee had gone to the casualty department following the incident, where he had been ascertained with swelling and discoloration on the arm caused by the assault, while the boyfriend had been reported to the police.

In a press release, Pernille Vermund wrote that Thiesen had been prohibited from taking her boyfriend to Christiansborg and party events, but had repeatedly defied this. In addition, Vermund explained that in the summer of 2022 Thiesen and her boyfriend had begun "sending intimidating and threatening messages" to the employee, and that Thiesen would not apologise to the employee or take responsibility for messages but in instead wanted the employee dismissed. According to several media, the employee in question had previously been in a relationship with Thiesen. In her later resignation post, Thiesen wrote about this, "I do not apologise for anything I have not done, or to someone who has hurt me. I don't want to do that to myself, because then I'll break". On 7 November, Nye Borgerlige's main board (hovedbestyrelse) held a crisis meeting about the case. Mette Thiensen announced the same day that she had left the party as of that day and wrote, among other things:

After the meeting, the party's main board stated that Thiesen would have been expelled from the party if she had not opted out in advance and that this had been the recommendation of the parliamentary group. Mette Thiesen's first replacement to the Folketing, Claus Bruncke, announced the day after her resignation that he was ready to enter the Folketing, if Thiesen chose to pass on her seat. Vermund said the day after that she expeted Thiesen either to remain an independent or join Danish People's Party (Dansk Folkeparti).

With her resignation Thiesen became the fastest politician in Danish history to leave the party one was elected for, having left six days after her election.

Danish People's Party 

On 12 January 2023 is was announced that Thiesen and had entered into an informal arrangement with Danish People's Party on practical issues regarding parliamentary work and stayed open about joining DF with the party's group chairman Peter Kofod stating, "If Mette Thiesen wants to be a member of the Danish People's Party, she has my number. Then we'll have a talk about it, should it become relevant". On 6 February 2023 is was in an interview to Danish newspaper Jyllands-Posten announced that Thiesen had officially joined Danish People's Party. By virtue of her shift, Thiesen became the second Nye Borgerlige MP to leave the party and join Danish People's Party with MP Mikkel Bjørn Sørensen having left Nye Borgerlige and joined the DF on 24 January 2023. Relative to her party shift, leader of the DF Morten Messerschmidt i.a. stated "Especially her social commitment and knowledge in the field of children and young people will be a great strength for the DF".

Conviction 
On 19 April 2018, Thiesen wrote a post on her Facebook profile with the heading "Terrorist sympathizer used by the Danish Broadcasting Corporation" about the fitness instructor Mahmoud Loubani. In connection with the comments, Thiesen further referred to Loubani as "a person who laughs at people who receive threats".

In January 2019, Loubani filed a lawsuit against Thiesen for the statements. On 13 December 2019, Thiesen was convicted in the Copenhagen District Court for defaming Loubani by calling him a "terrorist sympathizer". In this connection, Thiesen had to pay compensation of DKK 15,000 to Loubani as well as the costs of the case. Thiesen was acquitted of punishment, as no proceedings were brought within six months of the statements.

References

External links 
 Biography on the website of the Danish Parliament (Folketinget)

1981 births
Living people
Conservative People's Party (Denmark) politicians
The New Right (Denmark) politicians
Danish municipal councillors
21st-century Danish women politicians
Women members of the Folketing
People from Fredensborg Municipality
Members of the Folketing 2019–2022
Members of the Folketing 2022–2026